Michael Bradley Dyne (August 19, 1918 – May 17, 1989) was a British-American television and film screenwriter. He was also an actor, and wrote one stage play.

Dyne was the son of sculptor Musgrave Bradley Dyne. He was born in London, educated in France and Switzerland. He became a writer and actor in Canada, then emigrated to the United States in 1938.

Dyne played small parts in some Paramount and 20th Century-Fox films (such as the Prince of Wales in Kitty (1945)). He tried out for the title role in The Picture of Dorian Gray (1945) but lost out to Hurd Hatfield.

Starting in 1949, Dyne became a pioneering television writer, turning out 25 plays for Studio One and also writing scripts for The Alcoa Hour, Kraft Television Theatre, Playhouse 90, and other television shows. From 1952 to 1970, Dyne wrote more than 150 dramas for television, including adaptations of Henry James, Pirandello, and Thomas Hardy.

Dyne also wrote movie scripts for Walt Disney Studios, including The Moon-Spinners (1964). He wrote the 1964 play The Right Honourable Gentleman which ran for three years in the West End and was also produced on Broadway.

He died in 1989 in Linlithgo, New York.

Filmography

References

External links

1918 births
1989 deaths
British emigrants to the United States
American male film actors
American male screenwriters
20th-century American male actors
20th-century American male writers
20th-century American screenwriters
British expatriates in France
British expatriates in Switzerland
British expatriates in Canada